Tynesoft Computer Software was a software developer and publisher in the 1980s and early 1990s.

History
The company was originally set up in 1983 by Colin Courtney and Trevor Scott
to release educational software but soon moved into the video games market on which it concentrated for most of its time. It developed numerous games for a wide variety of 8-bit micros, particularly those less well catered for by other publishers such as the Commodore 16, BBC Micro and Atari 8-bit. They also had a budget label, MicroValue, that issued compilations, reissues and some original games.

They had most success with their multi-load games such as Summer Olympiad, Circus Games and Rodeo Games. They also released licensed ports to smaller systems such as Software Projects' Jet Set Willy (Atari 8-bit, Commodore 16/Plus/4, BBC Micro and Acorn Electron), First Star Software's Boulder Dash (BBC, Electron) and Spy vs. Spy (C16/+4, BBC, Electron) and Mindscape's Indoor Sports (C16/+4, BBC, Electron). From the late 1980s, they released games for the 16-bit computers Amiga and Atari ST as well as PC but failed to capture a large share of this new market and with the demise of the 8-bit games scene, their sales fell. The company went bankrupt in June 1990 when its sister printing business incurred massive debts.

Legacy

Programmer Brian Jobling left the company in 1988 to set up Zeppelin Games with programmer and journalist Derek Brewster.

Colin Courtney set up a new company, Flair Software, which continued to use the MicroValue label for budget releases. Flair published one title that had originally been scheduled for release by Tynesoft, Elvira: The Arcade Game, but a reported conversion of Games Workshop's Blood Bowl never appeared. The company currently operates under the name Casual Arts and releases games for PC, Mac, Nintendo DS/3DS, iOS, Android and Kindle.

Select titles

 1984 Auf Wiedersehen Pet (Acorn Electron, BBC Micro, Commodore 64, ZX Spectrum)
 1984 Bingo (C64, Spectrum)
 1984 Rig Attack (Electron, BBC, Commodore 16, Commodore Plus/4)
 1984 Olympiad (C16/+4)
 1984 US Drag Racing (Electron, BBC, C16/+4)
 1985 Ian Botham's Test Match (Electron, BBC, C64, Spectrum, C16/+4, Amstrad CPC)
 1985 Super Gran (C64, Spectrum, C16/+4, CPC)
 1985 Super Gran: The Adventure (Electron, BBC, C64, Spectrum, C16/+4)
 1985 Mouse Trap (Electron, BBC, C64, Atari 8-bit, Atari ST, Amiga)
 1986 Future Shock (Electron, BBC, C16/+4)
 1986 Commonwealth Games aka European Games (Electron, BBC, C64, C16/+4, MSX)
 1986 Winter Olympics (Electron, BBC, C16/+4, Atari 8-bit, MSX)
 1986 The Big KO (Electron, BBC, C64)
 1987 Phantom (Electron, BBC, C64, C16/+4, Atari 8-bit)
 1987 Mirax Force (Atari 8-bit)
 1987 Who Dares Wins II (Atari 8-bit)
 1988 Summer Olympiad (Electron, BBC, C64, Spectrum, ST, Amiga)
 1988 Winter Olympiad '88 (Electron, BBC, C64, Spectrum, Atari 8-bit, ST, Amiga)
 1989 Circus Games (Electron, BBC, C64, Spectrum, CPC, ST, Amiga, Apple II, PC)
 1989 Superman: The Man of Steel (Electron, BBC, C64, Spectrum, CPC, ST, Amiga, MSX, Apple II, PC)
 1989 Buffalo Bill's Rodeo Games aka Buffalo Bill's Wild West Rodeo Show (Electron, BBC, C64, Spectrum, CPC, ST, Amiga, Apple II, PC)
 1989 Roller Coaster Rumbler (C64, ST, Amiga, PC)
 1989 Mayday Squad (C64, ST, Amiga, PC)
 1990 Beverly Hills Cop (BBC, C64, Spectrum, CPC, ST, Amiga, PC)

References

External links
 http://www.stairwaytohell.com/articles/KBlake.html

Defunct video game companies of the United Kingdom
Video game companies established in 1983